Felicite Rwemarika was born on 9 March 1958 in Ruanda-Urundi (now Rwanda). She has been a member of the IOC since 2018. Rwemarika has organized many international conferences on gender equality in sports and in society as a whole. She is also a speaker at the American University of Nigeria on unity and reconciliation through sport. Rwemarika organizes workshops and seminars in order to raise awareness for gender equality in sports and promote sport as a powerful tool for peace-building, conflict resolution, and economic empowerment. Rwemarika has dedicated herself to heal women who were victims of the 1994 Tutsi genocide through activities which are held by the Association of Kigali Women in Sports (AKWOS). She is a supporter of gender equality and encourages the wider participation of both women and men in the conversations about gender-based violence, women empowerment, HIV/AIDS reconciliation and entrepreneurship. She is also an organizer of financial literacy trainings and bespoke competitions for the AKWOS members.

Education
From 1985 until 1995, Rwemarika studied at the Mulago Hospital in Uganda and received her Diploma in Nursing. In 2007 she received her Diploma in Business Administration from Cambridge College Online. Rwemarika also has a Diploma in FIFA leadership development program.

Career
From 1985 to 1995, Rwemarika was a medical nurse at the Mulago Hospital in Uganda. In 1997 and 2004 she was the founder of two businesses, a beauty salon and a restaurant. From 2004 to 2008, she was Country coordinator of We Act for Hope NGO, where in 2009 she became chair. She was also Chair of the Rwanda NGO forum on HIV & AIDS and health promotion in 2015.

Sports career
In 2003, she was founder, chair and legal representative of AKWOS. From 2007 until 2001, Rwemarika was a board member of the international women's organization Women Win. She was a member of the CECAFA Women Commission in 2011. From 2013 to 2017, she was executive and advisor of the RNOSC (Rwanda National Olympic and Sports Committee). From 2017 to 2018, she was president of the Women's Football Commission in the Rwandan Football Federation (FERWAFA). Also in 2013, she was president of the Rwanda Women and Sports Commission. In 2017, she was a member of the Sport and Active Society Commission, and in 2018 a IOC Member. From 2007 until present, she remains a member of the FERWAFA Executive board, 1st vice president of the Rwanda Olympic and Other Games, as well as initiator of Women Football in Rwanda.

Honors
Rwemarika was selected as and made an Ashoka Fellow in 2012. In 2015 she received an award from the Stars Foundation and from Girls Collective. In 2016, she received the IOC Award for Women and Sport on the African continent.

References

International Olympic Committee members
Gender equality
Rwandan women
1958 births
Living people
Ashoka Fellows